Carlos Mäder (born 23 October 1978 in Cape Coast, Ghana) also known as Kojo Benya Brown is a Ghanaian-Swiss alpine ski racer. In January 2022, he qualified for the 2022 Winter Olympics representing Ghana. He competes primarily in slalom and giant slalom.

References

External links 

 Carlos Mäder profile on International Ski Federation
 Carlos Mäder profile  on 2022 Winter Olympics

Living people
1978 births
Ghanaian male alpine skiers
Olympic alpine skiers of Ghana
Alpine skiers at the 2022 Winter Olympics